Duprat is a surname. Notable people with the surname include:

 Chevalier Alfredo Duprat (born 1816), Portuguese military official
 Antoine Duprat (1463–1535), French chancellor and cardinal
 François Duprat (1940–1978), French essayist and politician
 Hubert Duprat (born 1957), French artist
 Jean Duprat, various people
 Patrick Duprat, Mayotte politician
 Pierre Louis Alfred Duprat, French colonial governor
 Rogério Duprat (1932–2006), Brazilian composer and musician